The Department of Electronics and Accreditation of Computer Courses (DOEACC) (Presently National Institute of Electronics and Information Technology - NIELIT) is an autonomous scientific society under the Ministry of Electronics and Information Technology, Government of India and is involved in training, consulting, product development, entrepreneurship and human resource development in information, electronics & communication technologies.  It is based in New Delhi with a network of centers on the globe. The DOEACC Society was created by the Department of Electronics to implement a scheme of the AICTE (All India Council of Technical Education), with a view to harness the resources available in the private sector for training in the Computers, with a view to meet the increasing requirement of the trained manpower. In December 2002,other Societies of the Department of Information Technology, (Dept. of Electronics was renamed as Dept. of Information Technology) like CEDT Aurangabad, CEDT Calicut, CEDT Jammu/Srinagar, CEDT Tezpur/Guwahati, CEDT Imphal, CEDT Aizawl, CEDT Gorakhpur, RCC Chandigarh, RCC Kolkata were merged into the DOEACC Society.  The acronym CEDT stands for Centre for Electronic Design and Technology and RCC stands for Regional Computer Centre.

DOEACC Society is now National Institute of Electronics and Information Technology.

Courses
There are four computer courses offered from DOEACC:

O Level Equivalent to Diploma course. There are four paper in this level.
A Level Equivalent to Advanced Diploma in Computer Applications. There are ten papers in this level.
B Level qualified students are eligible to apply where MCA Master of Computer Applications is a desirable qualification. It's equivalent to MCA. For students doing B level after A level, there are fifteen papers, for students doing B level directly, there are 25 papers.
C Level equivalent to M. Tech Level.

Other than these, courses are also taught in bio-informatics and hardware.

External links 
 

Ministry of Communications and Information Technology (India)